Bunny Chan Chung-bun  (born 1957) is a Hong Kong businessman and politician. He is the former chairman of the Kwun Tong District Council, a Hong Kong deputy to the National People's Congress of China and the chairman of the Hong Kong Army Cadets Association.

History
Bunny Chan was born in Hong Kong in 1957 with his family originated from Chaozhou. After graduating from secondary school in 1976, he worked at To Kwa Wan’s Kai Ngai Embroidery Factory as a clerk and a sewing trainee and learnt procedures such as blinding and button holing form working at his friends' and foreman's workshops.

In 1979, he opened a factory with a capital of 2000 dollars and rented a site in Mei King Mansion for manufacturing travel bags and other gifts, a predecessor of Prospectful Garment Factory. In 1983, he switched to producing children's clothes and set up Prospectful Holdings Ltd. and became its chairman which outsource its production processes and expanded in scale. He moved the factory to Kwun Tong in 1985 and later bought out the site.

He was first appointed to the Kwun Tong District Council in 2000, and then elected chairman of the council from 2004. He first contested in the 2011 District Council election and won a seat in Hip Hong, which he lost his seat in 2019 following a rout of pro-Beijing candidates amidst the 2019–20 Hong Kong protests. Chan was appointed council member of the Open University of Hong Kong from 2006 to 2012 in which he was conferred Doctor of Business Administration, honoris causa, by the university in 2013. He is also a vice-chairperson of the Community Care Fund Task Force of the Commission on Poverty from 2012. He is a member of the Council for Sustainable Development from 2015. In 2012 he was elected to the National People's Congress by the electoral college as a Hong Kong deputy.

Chan was appointed to the Commission on Youth in 2004 and was chairman from 2009 to 2015. He is also the founding chairman of the Hong Kong Army Cadets Association which was established in 2015. The mission of the Association is said to enhance youths’ attributes of self-enhancement, self-discipline, self-confidence, sense of responsibility, leadership and volunteerism. However the association sparked controversy over its "secretive" inauguration ceremony held in the restricted area of the People’s Liberation Army navy base on Stonecutters Island with the few members of the media invited all having close ties to Beijing. The association was blasted as pro-Beijing indoctrination.

Chan was appointed Justice of the Peace in 2002 and was awarded the Bronze Bauhinia Star medal in 2004, Silver Bauhinia Star medal in 2009 and Gold Bauhinia Star medal in 2014.

References

1957 births
Living people
Delegates to the 12th National People's Congress from Hong Kong
Delegates to the 13th National People's Congress from Hong Kong
Delegates to the 14th National People's Congress from Hong Kong
District councillors of Kwun Tong District
Hong Kong businesspeople
Members of the Election Committee of Hong Kong, 2000–2005
Recipients of the Bronze Bauhinia Star
Recipients of the Gold Bauhinia Star
Recipients of the Silver Bauhinia Star